SFHA may refer to:

 Special Flood Hazard Areas, geographic areas identified by the U.S. National Flood Insurance Program
 Scottish Federation of Housing Associations, Scotland's federation of housing associations
 Storage Foundation HA (High Availability), a VERITAS Software product. VERITAS Software is now owned by Symantec
 South Fallsburg Hebrew Association, an Orthodox Jewish congregation in South Fallsburg, New York.